The Central District of Takestan County is a district (bakhsh) in Takestan County, Qazvin Province, Iran. At the 2006 census, its population was 99,841, in 24,971 families.  The District has two cities: Takestan and Narjeh.   The District has three rural districts (dehestan): Narjeh Rural District, Qaqazan-e Gharbi Rural District, and Qaqazan-e Sharqi Rural District.

References 

Districts of Qazvin Province
Takestan County